Mamye Edmondson BaCote (February 18, 1939 – December 14, 2020) was an American politician of the Democratic Party. She was a member of the Virginia House of Delegates, representing the 95th District from 2004 to 2016.

Background
BaCote was born in Halifax, Virginia. She received her bachelor's degree from Virginia Union University, in 1960, and her master's degree from Hampton Institute in 1967. BaCote taught in the Newport News Public School System for many years and was a university professor. She served on the Newport News City Council from 1996 to 2003.

House of Delegates
BaCote was first elected to the Virginia House of Delegates in 2003 after delegate Flora D. Crittenden announced her retirement from representing the 95th House of Delegates district. BaCote served until 2015. Assigned to the House Appropriations committee, BaCote secured funding for the Newport News Drug Court, thus offering participants the opportunity to stay out of jail through intense rehabilitation efforts.

Death
BaCote died on December 14, 2020 in Newport News, Virginia.

Notes

References

External links
Project Vote Smart – Representative Mamye E. BaCote (VA) profile
Follow the Money – Mamye E. BaCote
2005 2003 campaign contributions

1939 births
2020 deaths
Virginia city council members
Democratic Party members of the Virginia House of Delegates
Politicians from Newport News, Virginia
African-American state legislators in Virginia
Women city councillors in Virginia
Women state legislators in Virginia
People from Halifax, Virginia
Virginia Union University alumni
Hampton University alumni
African-American women in politics
Educators from Virginia
21st-century American politicians
21st-century American women politicians
21st-century African-American women
21st-century African-American politicians
20th-century African-American people
20th-century African-American women